The Chamarajanagar–Tirupati Express is an Express train belonging to South Western Railway zone that runs between  and  in India. It is currently being operated with 16219/16220 train numbers on a daily basis.

Earlier, since inauguration in 1992, this train was Mysuru–Tirupati Fast Passenger with train number 6213/6214, In 2008 train was extended till Chamarajanagara to run as Chamarajanagar–Tirupati Fast Passenger (56213/56214) and was converted into an express service with change in the train number on 22 August 2017.

Service

The 16219/Chamarajanagar–Tirupati Express has an average speed of 42 km/hr and covers 533 km in 12h 40m. 
The 16220/Tirupati–Chamarajanagar Express has an average speed of 47 km/hr and covers 533 km in 11h 15m .

Route and halts 

The important halts of the train are:

 
 
 
 
 
 Bangalore City

Coach composition

The train has standard ICF rakes with max speed of 110 kmph. The train consists of 21 coaches:
 1 First AC
 1 AC 2TIER
 2 AC 3TIER
 11 Sleeper coaches
 4 General 
 2 Second-class Luggage/parcel van

Traction

Both trains are hauled by an Krishnarajapuram Loco Shed-based WDP-4 WDP-4D diesel locomotive from Chamrajnagar to Mysore. From Mysore train is hauled by an Arakkonam Loco Shed-based WAP-4 electric locomotive to Tirupati and vice versa.

Schedule 

Train runs daily for both the side.

See also 

 Chamarajanagar railway station
 Tirupati Main railway station

Notes

References

External links 

 16219/Chamarajanagar–Tirupati Express India Rail Info
 16220/TirupatiChamarajanagar Express India Rail Info

Transport in Tirupati
Express trains in India
Rail transport in Karnataka
Rail transport in Andhra Pradesh
Rail transport in Tamil Nadu
Railway services introduced in 2017